RVN can stand for:
 CBN (Australian TV station), which had this callsign for it’s Riverina station until 1991
 Registered Veterinary Nurse in the UK
 Republic of Vietnam, a former state in southern Vietnam
 Rovaniemi Airport, in Finland
 Ruud van Nistelrooy, a Dutch footballer